Road to Perdition is the soundtrack, on the Decca Records label, of the 2002 Academy Award-winning and Golden Globe-nominated film Road to Perdition starring Tyler Hoechlin, Tom Hanks, Jennifer Jason Leigh, Jude Law, Daniel Craig and Paul Newman. The original score was composed by Thomas Newman.

The album was nominated for the Academy Award for Best Original Score, but lost to the score of Frida.

Track listing 
"Rock Island, 1931" – 3:22
"Wake" – 1:55
"Just the Feller" – 2:44
"Mr. Rance" – 1:38
"Bit Borrowers" – 2:25
"Murder (in Four Parts)" – 7:54
"Road to Chicago" – 3:06
"Reading Room" – 1:25
"Someday Sweetheart" – 3:06
Performed by The Charleston Chasers
"Meet Maguire" – 1:44
"Blood Dog" – 1:06
"Finn McGovern" – 2:11
"The Farm" – 2:09
"Dirty Money" – 3:10
"Rain Hammers" – 2:41
"A Blind Eye" – 2:27
"Nothing to Trade" – 2:25
"Queer Notions" – 2:46
Performed by Fletcher Henderson & His Orchestra
"Virgin Mary" – 1:34
"Shoot the Dead" – 2:shoot the dead25
"Grave Drive" – 1:20
"Cathedral" – 2:40
Contains a Vocal Sample from the song "Alma Redemptoris Mater", Performed by Choir of King's College
"There'll Be Some Changes Made" – 2:59
Performed by the Chicago Rhythm Kings
"Ghosts" – 3:40
"Lexington Hotel, Room 1432" – 1:45
"Road to Perdition" – 3:55
"Perdition – Piano Duet" – 1:39
Performed by Tom Hanks and Paul Newman

References

Crime film soundtracks
Thomas Newman albums
2002 soundtrack albums
Decca Records soundtracks